The Shihezi Economic and Technological Development Zone is an economic and technical development zone at national level located in the eastern suburbs of Shihezi City, Xinjiang Uygur Autonomous Region, China. It is situated east to Hetan Road, west to the Dongsi and Dongqi Roads, south to the Northern Xinjiang railway, north to G312 National Highway, the total planning area is 11.2 square kilometers.

Formation and history
The development zone is the manufacturing center of 8th Division of Xinjiang Production and Construction Corps and Shihezi City, it was established in December 1992 with the approval of the Government of Xinjiang Uygur Autonomous Region, and in 1996 the Science and Technology Commission of the Autonomous Region approved the establishment of an industrial technology park in the area. On April 24, 2000, it was upgraded to a national economic and technological development zone with the approval of the State Council. It was identified as the "Third Batch of Processing Trade Gradient Transfer Base"  by the Ministry of Commerce, Ministry of Human Resources and Social Security, and General Administration of Customs on November 5, 2010, and the "A-Class National New Materials High-tech Industrialization Base" by the Ministry of Science and Technology on March 14, 2014.

The development zone is entrusted to manage the unified development and construction of the North Industrial Park and the Chemical New Material Industrial Park. The total planned area of one zone and two parks was 72.6 square kilometers. The functional departments and offices of the Development Zone Management Committee include the Comprehensive Office, the Finance Bureau, the Land Planning and Construction Bureau, the Economic Development Bureau, the Social Development Bureau, the Investment Service Center, the Information Center and the Investment Promotion Center. Under the jurisdiction of the Dongcheng Subdistrict Office in the development zone, there are other agencies implemented dual leadership, such as business service, taxation, justice and police organizations.

In 2018, the development zone achieved a GDP of CN￥21.52 billion (US$3.25 billion), up 6.5% YoY, of which the value added of the secondary industry was CN￥15,580 million (US$2,354 million), up 8.2% YoY, and the value added of the tertiary industry was CN￥5,940 million (US$898 million), up 2.4% YoY. The fixed assets investment was CN￥5,290 million (US$799 million), down 51.1% YoY. 55 new projects were signed, CN￥27,420 million (US$4,144 million) was invested, its tax was about CN￥6 billion (US$907 million),  and 470 new registered enterprises were added, reaching a total of 3,180 in 2018.

Large enterprises 
There are four large companies registered in the development zone, including three listed companies.
 Tianshan Aluminum (Tianshan Aluminum Limited by Share Ltd)
 Xinjiang Tianfu (Xinjiang Tianfu Energy Co., Ltd; ; SSE:600509)
 Xinjiang Tianye (Xinjiang Tianye Co., Ltd; ; SSE:600075)
 Western Animal Husbandry (Xinjiang Western Animal Husbandry Co., Ltd; ; SZSE:300106)

Four non-locally registered large companies set up branches here
 Huaxing Glass (Guangdong Huaxing Glass Limited Co., Ltd)
 Hoshine Silicon (Hoshine Silicon Industry Co., Ltd; ; SSE:603260)
 HuaFang Textile (HuaFang Textile Co., Ltd; ; SSE:600273)
 Yurun Food (Yurun Food Group Limited; ; SEHK:01068)

References 

Xinjiang Production and Construction Corps
1992 establishments in China
Special Economic Zones of China